D412 is a road in Croatia. It branches off to the south from D8 in Drvenik towards Drvenik ferry dock and provides ferry access to Sućuraj and the D116 road on the island Hvar.

The road, as well as all other state roads in Croatia, is managed and maintained by Hrvatske ceste, state owned company.

Traffic volume
Traffic is not regularly counted on the road, however, Hrvatske ceste report number of vehicles using Drvenik-Sućuraj and Drvenik-Korčula ferry lines, connecting the D412 to the D116 and the D118 state roads respectively. Furthermore the D412 road carries local traffic in Drvenik itself, which does not use the ferries at all, greatly exceeding the ferried traffic. Substantial variations between annual (AADT) and summer (ASDT) traffic volumes are attributed to the fact that the road connects to a number of summer resorts on Hvar and Korčula islands.

Road junctions and populated areas

References

State roads in Croatia
Transport in Split-Dalmatia County